Comedy Cafe is a Canadian comedy television series which aired on CBC Television in 1969.

Premise
This Montreal-produced series featured performers from CBC Radio's Funny You Should Say That series, namely Barrie Baldaro, Joan Stuart and Ted Zeigler. They were joined by additional performers Dave Broadfoot and George Carron. The series borrowed from material already broadcast on the radio series such as "The Tavern" in which men have a conversation at a bar, or "L'Anglaises" about a French-speaking husband (Carron) and his English-speaking wife (Stuart). The series also featured Broadfoot's frequently-performed Member for Kicking Horse Pass character.

Comedy Cafe already aired as a local series in Montreal since late 1968. It was brought to the national network to fill in the time slot left vacant by the demise of Barris and Company. The series also transitioned to colour broadcasts due to its national exposure.

Episodes were recorded at Montreal's Windsor Hotel in the Versailles Room.

Scheduling
This half-hour series was broadcast Saturdays at approximately 10:15 p.m. (Eastern) from 1 February to 8 March 1969, following the conclusion of the Hockey Night in Canada broadcast.

References

External links
 
 

CBC Television original programming
1969 Canadian television series debuts
1969 Canadian television series endings
Television shows filmed in Montreal